Kah Gishan (also Romanized as Kāh Gīshān) is a village in Irandegan Rural District, Irandegan District, Khash County, Sistan and Baluchestan Province, Iran. At the 2006 census, its population was 45, in 9 families.

References 

Populated places in Khash County